Charles Dodgson  ( – 21 January 1795) was an English Anglican cleric who served in the Church of Ireland as the Bishop of Ossory (1765–1775) then Bishop of Elphin (1775–1795).

Dodgson was born in Howden, Yorkshire. His date of birth is not recorded; he was baptised on 10 January 1722. His father, Christopher Dodgson (1696–1750), was the curate there. Charles Dodgson was educated at Westminster School and St. John's College, Cambridge.

After ordination, he was appointed to the parish of Bintry, Norfolk in 1746. He moved to the north of England, keeping a school at Stanwix in Cumberland and becoming Rector of Kirby Wiske in 1755. He was tutor to Lord Algernon Percy, the son of the Duke of Northumberland; in 1762, the Duke gave him the parish of Elsdon, Northumberland. Dodgson was elected as a fellow of the Royal Society in 1762.

Rapidly promoted, he was nominated to the bishopric of Ossory on 22 June and consecrated at St. Werburgh's Church, Dublin on 11 August 1765 by William Carmichael, Archbishop of Dublin. Ten years later, he was translated to the bishopric of Elphin by letters patent on 12 April 1775. King George III congratulated him on this promotion, saying that he ought indeed to be thankful to have got away from a palace where the stabling was so bad.

Marriage and children
In 1768, he married Mary Frances Smyth (1749–1796). Among their children were Captain Charles Dodgson (1769?–1803), Elizabeth Anne Dodgson (1770–1836) and 2nd Lieut. Percy Currer Dodgson RN (1782–1807). Captain Dodgson was the father of Charles Dodgson (Archdeacon of Richmond) and the grandfather of Lewis Carroll. Elizabeth Dodgson married Major Charles Lutwidge; among their children was Frances, mother of Lewis Carroll.

He died in Dublin on 21 January 1795 and was buried at St. Bride's Church, Dublin.

Notes

References

 
 
 
 
 
 

1720s births
1795 deaths
People from Howden
Alumni of St John's College, Cambridge
Anglican bishops of Elphin
Anglican bishops of Ossory
18th-century Anglican bishops in Ireland
Fellows of the Royal Society
People educated at Westminster School, London
Clergy from Yorkshire
Dodgson family